John McDonald (born 11 March 1893) was a Scottish footballer who played as a right back for clubs including Airdrieonians, Everton and New Brighton. He was Everton captain in the 1921–22 season, and held the club record for most appearances without scoring (224) until the mark was passed by Tony Hibbert in 2011. With Airdrie, he had been selected twice for the Scottish Football League XI in 1919.

References

1893 births
Year of death unknown
Footballers from North Lanarkshire
Scottish footballers
Barnsley F.C. players
Scottish Junior Football Association players
Motherwell F.C. players
English Football League players
New Brighton A.F.C. players
Airdrieonians F.C. (1878) players
Everton F.C. players
Dykehead F.C. players
Colwyn Bay F.C. players
Connah's Quay & Shotton F.C. players
Scottish Football League players
Association football defenders
Sportspeople from Shotts